The 2008 Northeast Conference men's basketball tournament took place March 6–12, 2008, at campus sites. Mount Saint Mary's won the tournament to receive an automatic berth to the 2008 NCAA Men's Division I Basketball Tournament.

Format
The top eight eligible men's basketball teams in the Northeast Conference receive a berth in the conference tournament.  After the conference season, teams are seeded by conference record. The semifinals matchups will be the highest and lowest remaining seeds in one game and the other two seeds in the other game. All games are held at the home court of the higher-seeded team.

Bracket

All-tournament team
Tournament MVP in bold.

Sources
Tournament Bracket

References

Tournament
Northeast Conference men's basketball tournament
Northeast Conference men's basketball tournament
Northeast Conference men's basketball tournament